Henry Carl Dorsch (November 27, 1940 – December 10, 2016) was a Canadian football player who played for the Saskatchewan Roughriders of the Canadian Football League (CFL). He won the Grey Cup with Saskatchewan in 1966. Born in Weyburn, Saskatchewan, he previously played for the University of Tulsa. He died in 2016 at the age of 76.

References

1940 births
2016 deaths
Canadian football fullbacks
Canadian players of American football
Saskatchewan Roughriders general managers
Saskatchewan Roughriders players
Tulsa Golden Hurricane football players
Sportspeople from Weyburn
Players of Canadian football from Saskatchewan